Danielle Huskisson (born 27 March 1993) is a British swimmer, specialising in open water events. She competed in the women's 10 km event at the 2019 World Aquatics Championships and she finished in 25th place.

References

External links
 
 

1993 births
Living people
British female swimmers
Place of birth missing (living people)
Female long-distance swimmers
20th-century British women
21st-century British women